Claire Guimond (born 26 October 1955 in Montreal, Quebec) is a Canadian flute player, founding member and former Artistic Director of Arion Baroque Orchestra.

Biography 
Guimond is a founding member of Arion Baroque Orchestra and has been the artistic director since 1981 to 2020. During this time, she invited numerous conductors and soloists specializing in early music to lead the orchestra. She also collaborated with musicologists in Italy, Spain, and the United Kingdom to create world premiere recordings and performances of rediscovered works. She has performed with Arion, both as a soloist and as an orchestra member in North America, South America, Europe, and Asia. During the 2019-2020 season, she was co-artistic director of Arion with Mathieu Lussier, her successor as artistic director.

In October 2019, Guimond was awarded the Betty Webster Award by Orchestras Canada for her "sustained and significant contribution over a number of years to the Canadian orchestral community, with an emphasis on leadership, education, and volunteerism." In January 2020, the Conseil Québécois de la Musique awarded her the Opus Award for Artistic Director of the year.

Many concerts and recordings in which she participated as a flautist or artistic director were given awards – Prix Opus, Juno Award, Félix Prize, International Handel Recording Prize, etc.

Guimond has recorded more than 40 CDs, including nearly 30 with Arion Baroque Orchestra. She has recorded albums as a soloist with harpsichordists Luc Beauséjour and Gary Cooper, cellist Jaap ter Linden and violinist Monica Huggett, among others.

She has made several radio and television recordings for Canadian, British, Belgian, Irish, and Mexican stations. She has performed under conductors specialized in baroque music, such as Ton Koopman, Masaaki Suzuki, Christophe Rousset, Andrew Parrott, Jordi Savall, Philippe Herreweghe, Rinaldo Alessandrini, Barthold Kuijken, Kent Nagano, Bruno Weil and Andrea Marcon.
Guimond was the artistic director of the Lamèque International Baroque Music Festival from 2000 to 2005. She is regularly invited as an adjudicator and jury member for graduate study recitals in early music as well as for music competitions. In June 2017, she was part of the jury at the International Festival of Early Music in Val de Loire (France) under the presidency of William Christie.

Guimond taught baroque flute at McGill University from 1980 to 2019 at the Baccalaureate, Master's, and Ph.D. levels. She also taught chamber music from 1980 to 1997. She regularly gives master classes and teaches at the Tafelmusik Baroque Summer Institute, which has been held in Toronto every summer since 2006.

In 2001, Guimond founded Les productions early-music.com, a record label devoted to the repertoire of early music. She was president of the Conseil Québécois de la Musique from 1994 to 1997.

Discography (selection) 
Claire Guimond recorded more than 40 CDs, amongst them, many as a soloist.

 Soloist

 1985 : Leclair, Hotteterre et Guillemain – Entre Paris et Versailles, with Chantal Rémillard (violin), Betsy MacMillan (viol), Hank Knox (harpsichord) et Arion Ensemble [FL23020]
 1991 : Telemann – Paris Quartets, with Chantal Rémillard (violin), Betsy MacMillan (viol), Hank Knox (harpsichord), Christina Mahler (cello) et Arion Ensemble [MVCD1040]
 1991 : Stamitz, Richter, Haydn, Gluck – Flute Concertos of the 18th Century, with Barthold Kuijken (flute), Tafelmusik and Jeanne Lamon (violin and direction) [SK48045]
 1993 : Telemann, Quentin et Mondonville – Conversations en musique, with Chantal Rémillard (violin), Betsy MacMillan (viol), Hank Knox (harpsichord), Susan Napper (cello) and Arion Ensemble [FL23078]
 1995 : Boismortier – 6 Sonatas for Flute and Harpsichord, Op. 91, with Luc Beauséjour (harpsichord) [FL23008]
 1995 : Bach – The Music Offering, with Chantal Rémillard (violin), Betsy MacMillan (viol), Hank Knox (harpsichord) and Arion Baroque Orchestra [FL23065]
 1995 : Telemann – 12 Fantasias for Flute without Bass [FL28053]
 1996 : Bach – 6 Trio Sonatas, BWV 525-530, with Chantal Rémillard (violin), Betsy MacMillan (viol and cello), Hank Knox (harpsichord) and Arion Ensemble [FL23086]
 1997 : Telemann – Tafelmusik (first production), with Arion Baroque Orchestra [FL23118]
 1998 : Leclair – Concertos, with Monica Huggett et Arion Baroque Orchestra [ACD22143]
 1999 : Blavet – Sonatas for Flute and Basso continuo, John Toll (harpsichord) and Jonathan Manson (viol) [ACD22204]
 2001 : Mozart – Flute Quartets, with the Trio Sonnerie, directed by Monica Huggett [EMCCD 7754]
 2001 : Bach – Orchestral Suites (Orchestral Suite No.2 in B minor, BWV 1067), with Arion Baroque Orchestra, directed by Barthold Kuijken [ACD22257]
 2001 : Bach – Suites and Concertos (Brandenburg Concerto No. 5 et Concerto for flute, violin and harpsichord, BWV 1044), with Arion Baroque Orchestra, directed by Jaap ter Linden [EMCCD7753]
 2002 : Telemann – 6 Concertos, with Luc Beauséjour (harpsichord) [EMCCD7755]
 2005 : Telemann – Tutti Flauti !, with Matthias Maute and Sophie Larivière (recorders), Mika Putterman (flute) and Arion Baroque Orchestra, directed by Jaap ter Linden [EMCCD7763]
 2005 : De Bach à Mozart – Sur les traces de la Sonate en trio, with Gary Cooper (harpsichord) and Jaap ter Linden (cello) [EMCCD7762]
 2006 : Vivaldi – Chiaroscuro, with Mathieu Lussier (bassoon) and Arion Baroque Orchestra [EMCCD7764]
 2007 : Telemann – Les Trésors Cachés, with Arion Baroque Orchestra, directed by Jaap ter Linden [EMCCD7766]
 2010 : C.P.E. Bach – Symphonies and Concertos (Flute Concerto, Wq 22), with Gary Cooper (harpsichord and direction) and Arion Baroque Orchestra [EMCCD7771]
 2017 : Quantz and Telemann – Rebelles Baroques, with Alexander Weimann (direction) and Arion Baroque Orchestra [EMCCD7777]

 Orchestra

 2007 : Rebel – Plaisirs Champêtres, with Arion Baroque Orchestra, directed by Daniel Cuiller [EMCCD7765]
 2008 : Corrette – Symphonies des Noël et Concertos Comiques, with Arion Baroque Orchestra [EMCCD7768]
 2012 : Bach – St John Passion, with Les Voix Baroques and Arion Baroque Orchestra, directed by Alexander Weimann [ACD22611]
 2017 : Bach – Magnificat, with Arion Baroque Orchestra, directed by Alexander Weimann [ACD22727]

Awards and distinctions 
Arion Baroque Orchestra won many awards for their concerts and recordings with Claire Guimond at their helm as Artistic Director: 9 Prix Opus, of the Conseil Québécois de la Musique, 2 Félix Awards, of ADISQ, 1 Juno Award of the Canadian Academy of Recording Arts and Sciences, and 1 Diapason d'Or from the French music magazine Diapason.
 1984 : 3rd Prize at Bruges International Musica Antiqua Competition (Belgium)
 2019 : Betty Webster Award
 2020 : Prix Opus, artistic director of the year

References

External links 
Official website
Official website of Arion Baroque Orchestra

1955 births
20th-century Canadian women musicians
Canadian classical flautists
Musicians from Montreal
French Quebecers
Living people
21st-century Canadian women musicians
20th-century flautists
21st-century flautists